Merley is a housing estate in Poole, England.

Merley may also refer to:

 Merley House, Wimborne, a house in Wimborne, England
 Henry Merley (died c.1415), member of Parliament for Dover
 Merley Cobham Sports F.C., sport club